Anke Gabriele Rehlinger (né Moos; born 6 April 1976) is a German lawyer and politician of the Social Democratic Party (SPD) who has served as the Minister-President of Saarland since 25 April 2022. After her party won the 2022 state elections in Saarland, she became the second female Minister-President after Annegret Kramp-Karrenbauer and the first from her party. She was previously the Deputy Minister President of Saarland from 17 December 2013 until her election by the State Parliament of Saarland as Minister President in 2022.

Early life, education and sports
Rehlinger studied law at Saarland University. During her time as a student, she was successful in field competitions in athletics. Up to today (April 2022) she holds the Saarland state record in shot put (16.03 m in Rehlingen on 17 August 1996) as well as the Saarland youth state record in discus throw (49.18 m on 23 September 1995 in Rehlingen).

She successfully competed in senior track and field German Championships in 2014 and 2015.

Political career

Career in state politics
Since the 2004 state elections, Rehlinger has been a member of the Landtag of Saarland. In parliament, she served as Chairwoman of the Committee on European Affairs (2008–2009) and of the Committee on Education, Cultural Affairs and Media (2009–2011). From 2011 until 2012, she was her parliamentary group's deputy chairwoman, under the leadership of chairman Heiko Maas.

Between 2012 and 2014, Rehlinger was State Minister of Justice, Consumer Protection and Environmental Affairs in the government of Minister President Annegret Kramp-Karrenbauer of Saarland. In 2014, she succeeded Heiko Maas and served as Deputy Minister-President and State Minister for Economic Affairs, first under the leadership of Kramp-Karrenbauer (2014–2018) and later Tobias Hans (2018–2022). She was the candidate of SPD in 2017 state elections, but lost against Kramp-Karrenbauer and continued her role in the state government instead.

As one of her state's representatives at the Bundesrat, Rehlinger served on the Committee on Labour, Integration and Social Policy; the Committee on Economic Affairs; and on the Committee on Transport.

In March 2018, Rehlinger succeeded Heiko Maas as leader of the SPD in Saarland; at a party convention, she was elected with a majority of 94.5 percent.

Career in national politics
Rehlinger co-chaired the SPD's national conventions in Berlin (2015, 2017, 2019) and Wiesbaden (2018).

In the negotiations to form a coalition government on the national level following the 2017 federal elections, Rehlinger co-chaired the working group on agriculture; her counterparts were Julia Klöckner and Christian Schmidt. She was also a member of the working group on transport.

At a SPD national convention in 2019, Rehlinger was elected as one of the five deputies of the party's co-chairs Saskia Esken and Norbert Walter-Borjans, alongside Klara Geywitz, Hubertus Heil, Kevin Kühnert and Serpil Midyatli.

In the negotiations to form a so-called traffic light coalition of the SPD, the Green Party and the Free Democratic Party (FDP) following the 2021 federal elections, Rehlinger led her party's delegation in the working group on mobility; her co-chairs from the other parties were Anton Hofreiter and Oliver Luksic.

Rehlinger was nominated by her party as delegate to the Federal Convention for the purpose of electing the President of Germany in 2022.

Other activities

Regulatory bodies
 Federal Network Agency for Electricity, Gas, Telecommunications, Post and Railway (BNetzA), Member of the advisory board (since 2014)

Corporate boards
 Landesbank Saar (SaarLB), Ex-Officio Member of the Supervisory Board 
 VSE AG, Ex-Officio Member of the Advisory Board

Non-profit organization
 Business Forum of the Social Democratic Party of Germany, Member of the Political Advisory Board (since 2018)
 Franco-German Institute (DFI), Member of the Board
 Völklingen Ironworks, Ex-Officio Chairwoman of the Supervisory Board
 IG Bergbau, Chemie, Energie (IG BCE), Member
 German Red Cross, Member

Personal life
From 1999 to 2022, Rehlinger was married to medical doctor Thomas Rehlinger. In 2008, she gave birth to a son.

References

External links 

 Homepage by Anke Rehlinger
 Anke Rehlinger – minister for economy, work, energy and traffic
 Welt.de: Die Frau hinter der Radikalreform der Erbschaft (german)

Members of the Landtag of Saarland
Social Democratic Party of Germany politicians
Living people
1976 births
21st-century German politicians
21st-century German women politicians
Saarland University alumni
People from Merzig-Wadern